Kunovci can refer to one of the following towns:

 Kunovci, Bosnia and Herzegovina
 Kunovci, Croatia